The Duck Galloo Ridge is a mainly underwater ridge, at the eastern end of Lake Ontario, spanning from Prince Edward County, Ontario to Jefferson County, New York.  In pre-Columbian times native people used the islands on the ridge as way stations, when crossing the lake. The islands and shoals that dot the ridge have been navigational hazards since sailing ships first started navigating the lake.

Islands on the ridge

See also
 Scotch Bonnet Ridge
 Salmon Point Ridge
 Point Petre Ridge

References

Lake Ontario